CVM Television (CVM TV) is a television station in Kingston, Jamaica, broadcasting news, entertainment, and sports programmes. It is known for its newscasts, Caribbean lifestyle shows, and also airs Caribbean and overseas movie and TV productions. Newswatch has been one of the channel's long-running programmes.

History
CVM is an acronym for the three original major shareholders granted the television license in 1991: "C" - Community Television Systems Limited; "V" - Videomax Limited and "M" - Mediamix Limited. It was granted a licence to operate in March 1991, and began providing commercial television services in March 1993.

Change of Ownership (2022)
It was reported on September 27, 2022 that CVM TV was sold to the VertiCast Media Group led by media mogul Oliver McIntosh. Oliver McIntosh had been in charge of cable sports channel Sportsmax for over two decades before forming his media company.

List of programmes

Current

Domestic

News
CVM Live: Morning Edition
CVM Live: Noon Edition
CVM Live: Evening Edition

Sports
Talking Sports

Breakfast
Good Morning Life

International

Drama
The Sopranos

Comedy
Are You Being Served?
Keeping Up Appearances

Former

International

Drama
ER
NYPD Blue
Picket Fences
Silk Stalkings
Street Justice
The X-Files

Children's
Ace Ventura: Pet Detective
Action Man
Adventures of the Gummi Bears
Animaniacs
Astro Boy
Barney & Friends
Beetlejuice
Doug
Free Willy
The Magic School Bus
The Mummy
The New Archies
Lazer Tag Academy
The Little Mermaid
Merrie Melodies
Pinky and the Brain
Police Academy
The Puzzle Place
Reading Rainbow
The Real Ghostbusters
Romeo!
Salty's Lighthouse
Sesame Street
Shoebox Zoo
Space Strikers
Superhuman Samurai Syber-Squad
Tak and the Power of Juju
Taz-Mania
Tenko and the Guardians of the Magic
V.R. Troopers

Comedy
The 5 Mrs. Buchanans
Blossom
Family Matters
The Fresh Prince of Bel-Air
Hangin' with Mr. Cooper
The Jamie Foxx Show
Married... with Children
Step by Step
The Upper Hand

See also

 Television Jamaica (TVJ)

References

External links
 

Television channels and stations established in 1993
1990s establishments in Jamaica
Television stations in Jamaica